The Tour of Belize is a road cycling stage race, covering a majority of the Belize countryside. The 2008 edition included six stages in more than five days. The race was started in 2003 by race director Roque Matus and was won by Belizean Jose Choto of Team Cayo.

The 2008 edition was the first time the race has not been won by a native. The 2008 edition also marks the first time a race in Belize has been recognized by the UCI, the international governing body for cycling.

Previous winners

External links

UCI America Tour races
Cycle races in Belize
Recurring sporting events established in 2003
2003 establishments in Belize